Route 96 or  was a national road in the Eastern Region of Iceland. It begins just west of Reyðarfjörður and heads through the Fáskrúðsfjörður road tunnel. It then follows the coast to Stöðvarfjörður and ends just outside Breiðdalsvík. In November 2017, the entire road became part of the Ring Road (Route 1), together with a part of Route 92, replacing the route over Breiðdalsheiði which in turn was re-numbered from Route 1 to a new road number, Route 95.

References 

Roads in Iceland